The Women's 100m Butterfly event at the 2007 Pan American Games took place at the Maria Lenk Aquatic Park in Rio de Janeiro, Brazil, with the final being swum on July 18.

Medalists

Records

Results

Finals

Preliminaries

References
For the Record, Swimming World Magazine, September 2007 (p. 48+49)

Butterfly, Women's 100
2007 in women's swimming